Aziouz Raïs (25 August 1954 – 10 December 2022) was an Algerian chaabi singer. He began performing at marriage celebrations in 1969 and rose to success in the 1990s.

Raïs died from a stroke on 10 December 2022, at the age of 68.

References

External Links
 

 
1954 births
2022 deaths
20th-century Algerian singers
20th-century Algerian male singers
21st-century Algerian singers
21st-century Algerian male singers
People from Blida